Melody Maker was a British weekly popular music newspaper, published between 1926 and 2000. It was the third publication, after the New Musical Express (in 1952) and the Record Mirror (in 1955), to start its own singles chart, effective 7 April 1956.  Like NME, Melody Maker drew a sample of random record stores by phone. Its first chart drew from figures for 19 shops; during the 1950s, sample sizes ranged from around 14–33 shops, and on 30 July 1960 the phoning of record shops was supplemented with postal returns; the first chart to use this method sampled 38 stores from 110 returns.  In its 9 February 1963 edition, Melody Maker disclosed that it received chart returns from 245 retailers and that its chart was audited by auditors supplied by Middlesex County Council.  When Disc & Music Echo (which at that point was published by the same company) began publishing Melody Makers charts after 26 August 1967 upon discontinuing its own chart the week before, the latter expanded their sample pool to 282.  After Record Retailer and the BBC contracted with the British Market Research Bureau (BMRB) to compile their singles and album charts in 1969, Melody Maker (and NME) gradually reduced their respective sample pools to the point where, by the next decade, each drew from 100 stores. The chart itself was originally a Top 20, extended to a Top 30 effective 14 April 1962, and Top 50 on 15 September 1962.  After 1 April 1967, Melody Maker reverted to a Top 30 chart.

Record charts in the United Kingdom began on 14 November 1952 when NME imitated an idea started in American Billboard magazine compiled their own hit parade. Until 15 February 1969, when the British Market Research Bureau (BMRB) chart was established, many periodicals compiled their own charts. During this time the BBC used aggregated results of the prominent NME, Melody Maker, Disc, Record Mirror and, later, Record Retailer charts to compile their Pick of the Pops chart. Prior to 1969 there was no universally accepted source or "official" singles chart; however, the Official Chart Company and Guinness' British Hit Singles & Albums regard the canonical sources for this period as NME before 10 March 1960 and Record Retailer from then until the BMRB took over in 1969. Although Record Retailer is now the most predominantly used source for charting music in the 1960s, NME had the biggest circulation of charts in the decade and was more widely followed. After the BMRB was formed, the NME continued compiling its own chart up until 14 May 1988.

Elvis Presley had the first "non-canonical" number-one in the history of the Melody Maker chart when his 1957 single "Party" reached the top, but couldn't get past number two on the NME chart which, prior to 10 March 1960, was the "canonical" chart source as determined by the Official Charts Company.  Between then and 1969, Melody Maker had a total of twenty number ones that did not reach number one on the NME chart before 1960, Record Retailer from then to 15 February 1969, and the British Market Research Bureau (BMRB) after that date.  Of that total, seven also failed to top the Record Mirror (pre-1962), NME (post-1960) or Disc charts.  Two were by The Beatles, whose 1967 hit "Penny Lane" / "Strawberry Fields Forever" and EP of Magical Mystery Tour only reached number one in Melody Maker; conversely, their "Lady Madonna" made the top of all charts but Melody Maker, where it got no higher than number two.


Number-one singles

Notes

References
Footnotes

Lists of number-one songs in the United Kingdom
1950s in British music
1960s in British music